Outline is the debut album by Gino Soccio, released in 1979 on RFC Records, a Warner Bros. Records disco subsidiary run by Ray Caviano.

The album peaked at No. 79 on the US Billboard 200 and No. 12 in Canada. "Dancer" is Soccio's only Billboard Hot 100 entry, peaking at No. 48, and his first No. 1 hit on the Disco Top 80 chart.

Track listing
All songs are written by Gino Soccio.

Personnel
Gino Soccio – vocals, keyboards, drums, guitar
Busta Jones – vocals, bass
Heather Gauthier – vocals
Julia Gilmore – vocals
Laurie Niedzielski – vocals
Sharon Lee Williams – vocals
Al McNeil – bass
Mark Hygden – drums
Terry Martell – drums
Carlyle Miller – flute, horns (4)
Walter Rossi – guitar
Richard Mortimer – horns
Roger Walls – horns
Yoram Levy – horns
Luc Boivin – percussion
Stanley Brown – synthesizer (1, 2, 4 and 5)

Production
Producer: Mix Machine
Engineer: Lindsay Kidd, Jose Bunting, Pierre Groulx
Art direction and illustration: Greg Porto

Charts

Weekly

Year-end

Singles

References

External links

1979 albums
Warner Records albums